João Paulo Daniel (born 12 January 1981) is a Brazilian former footballer.

Career 
Born in Araras, São Paulo state, João Paulo started his career at Paulista Futebol Clube. He was loaned to União São João and Juventude in 2002 and 2003 season. In September 2004 he left for Servette FC of Swiss Super League. In mid-season, he left for Ciudad de Murcia of Spanish Segunda División along with Roberto Merino due to bankrupt of the club.

In mid-2005, he was signed by Young Boys. In 2006 he helped Young Boys reach the Swiss Cup Final, however he missed his penalty in the shootout and they were defeated by FC Sion. He was loaned to Strasbourg in January 2007. He signed a two-year contract extension in the June 2007. but left for league rival Neuchâtel Xamax in December, on a reported -year contract. However, he left the club in January 2009.

In October 2009 he left for Liga de Honra side Portimonense and finished as the runner-up of the league and promoted to Primeira Liga.

In August 2010 he returned to Brazil, signed a contract until end of year with Desportivo Brasil of Campeonato Paulista Segunda Divisão. He played 4 times for the club at the state league 4th level. The team finished as the losing side of the second stage (round of 24), finished as the bottom of the group.

In September, he left for São Caetano.

Wisła Płock
In July 2011, he joined Polish club Wisła Płock on a one-year contract.

References

External links
 
 
 Portuguese League stats. at LPFP.pt 
 
 Swiss League stats. at Football.ch 
 Futpedia 
 
 

1981 births
Living people
Brazilian footballers
Swiss Super League players
Ligue 2 players
Segunda División players
I liga players
Desportivo Brasil players
Paulista Futebol Clube players
União São João Esporte Clube players
Esporte Clube Juventude players
Grêmio Osasco Audax Esporte Clube players
Servette FC players
Ciudad de Murcia footballers
BSC Young Boys players
RC Strasbourg Alsace players
Neuchâtel Xamax FCS players
Portimonense S.C. players
Associação Desportiva São Caetano players
Wisła Płock players
Expatriate footballers in Switzerland
Expatriate footballers in Spain
Expatriate footballers in France
Expatriate footballers in Poland
Brazilian expatriate sportspeople in Switzerland
Brazilian expatriate sportspeople in Spain
Brazilian expatriate sportspeople in France
Brazilian expatriate sportspeople in Poland
Brazilian expatriate footballers
Association football forwards
People from Araras
Footballers from São Paulo (state)